Coahuayana is a municipality located in the southwest region of the Mexican state of Michoacán. The municipality has an area of 362.34 square kilometres (0.61% of the surface of the state) and is bordered to the north by the municipality of Chinicuila, to the south by Aquila and the Pacific Ocean, and to the west and northwest by the state of Colima. The municipality had a population of 11,632 inhabitants according to the 2005 census.  Its municipal seat is the city of the same name.

Coahuayana is a word of Náhuatl origin that means "Place Where Trees and Squash are Abundant".

References

Cultura y Magia en las narraciones orales de Coahuayana / Gloria Vergara Mendoza http://www.redalyc.org/articulo.oa?id=31601704

Municipalities of Michoacán